Boyd Anderson Tackett (May 9, 1911 – February 23, 1985) was a U.S. Representative from Arkansas.

Biography
Tackett was born near Black Springs in Montgomery County in southwestern Arkansas.  He moved with his parents to Glenwood, Arkansas, and attended public school; afterwards, he matriculated at Arkansas Polytechnic College at Russellville (1930–1932), continued at Ouachita College in Arkadelphia (1932–1933), and graduated in 1935 from the University of Arkansas School of Law at Fayetteville.

After being admitted to the bar, Tackett practiced law in Glenwood, Murfreesboro, and Nashville, Arkansas, until he was elected in 1936 to the Arkansas House of Representatives.  He also served as the prosecuting attorney of the 9th Judicial Circuit of Arkansas until 1943, when he enlisted in the United States Army. Tackett served as a corporal in the Signal Corps until his discharge in 1944, when he resumed his law practice in Nashville.

In 1948, Tackett was elected as a member of the U.S. House of Representatives from Arkansas's 4th District as a Democrat to the 81st and 82nd Congresses. He did not seek reelection to the House  in 1952 but instead lost his bid for the Democratic gubernatorial nomination to Francis Cherry. Tackett returned to Texarkana and his law practice, where he remained until retirement in 1980.

Tackett lived again in Nashville, Arkansas, from 1983 until his death two years later.  He was interred there at Restland Memorial Park.

References
 
 Political Graveyard index

1911 births
1985 deaths
Democratic Party members of the Arkansas House of Representatives
United States Army non-commissioned officers
People from Montgomery County, Arkansas
People from Nashville, Arkansas
People from Texarkana, Arkansas
Arkansas lawyers
Ouachita Baptist University alumni
University of Arkansas School of Law alumni
Democratic Party members of the United States House of Representatives from Arkansas
20th-century American lawyers
20th-century American politicians
United States Army personnel of World War II